Stenanthemum intricatum is a species of flowering plant in the family Rhamnaceae and is endemic to the southwest of Western Australia. It is an erect to spreading, often wiry shrub with sparsely hairy young stems, egg-shaped to fan-shaped leaves and greyish, densely softly-hairy heads of white or cream-coloured flowers.

Description
The tips of the leaves have three teeth, the upper surface is softly-hairy and the lower surface densely covered with greyish, star-shaped hairs. The flowers are white to cream-coloured, and densely covered with softly-hairy, greyish, star-shaped hairs.

Taxonomy and naming
Stenanthemum intricatum was first formally described in 1995 by Barbara Lynette Rye in the journal Nuytsia from specimens collected near Kalbarri in 1968. The specific epithet (intricatum) means "entangled", referring to the branching pattern of this species.

Distribution and habitat
This species grows in heath and shrubland between Kalbarri and Cunderdin in the Avon Wheatbelt, Esperance Plains, Geraldton Sandplains, Jarrah Forest, Mallee and Swan Coastal Plain bioregions of south-western Western Australia.

Conservation status
Stenanthemum intricatum is listed as "not threatened" by the Government of Western Australia Department of Biodiversity, Conservation and Attractions.

References

intricatum
Rosales of Australia
Flora of Western Australia
Plants described in 1995
Taxa named by Barbara Lynette Rye